Simeon Mills (February 14, 1810 – June 1, 1895) was a Democratic member of the Wisconsin State Senate from Dane County in the 1st Wisconsin Legislature. He introduced the bill which became the charter for the University of Wisconsin.

Biography
Mills was born in 1810. Named assistant postmaster, he walked from Chicago to Madison, Wisconsin Territory, arriving in June 1837. Mills met John Catlin and became the first Deputy Postmaster of Madison in 1837, housing the post office itself in his own store. He was the Clerk of the District Court of Dane County and the Clerk of the Supreme Court of the Wisconsin Territory. Mills was the last treasurer of the territory and was elected to the 1st Wisconsin Legislature in 1848. During the American Civil War, he was the Paymaster of Wisconsin. Mills died in 1895.

"Elmside" 
His former home, known as the Simeon Mills House, "Mills Folly," or "Elmside", was added to the National Register of Historic Places in 1997. It was built in 1863 and he resided there until 1867, when he sold it to J. W. Hudson. The structure, now a multi-family residence, suffered $100,000 in damage in a fire June 21, 2012.

An area where a number of his businesses were located, now known as the Simeon Mills Historic District, is also listed.

Career
Prior to serving in the Senate, Mills was Treasurer of the Wisconsin Territory, President of Madison, and a Justice of the Peace.

Photo gallery

References

 
 

1810 births
1895 deaths
People from Norfolk, Connecticut
American justices of the peace
Mayors of Madison, Wisconsin
Democratic Party Wisconsin state senators
Wisconsin Territory officials
19th-century American politicians
19th-century American judges
Wisconsin pioneers